The UK National Collection is a collection of around 280 historic rail vehicles (predominantly of British origin). The majority of the collection is kept at four national museums:
 National Railway Museum, York
 Locomotion, Shildon
 Science Museum, Kensington, London
 Science and Industry Museum, Manchester
Other items are on short or long-term loans to museums and heritage railways such as the Museum of the Great Western Railway at Swindon and the Head of Steam museum at Darlington.



Steam locomotives

Standard gauge designs up to 1869
These locomotives are all  gauge unless noted otherwise.

Standard gauge designs 1870 to 1899
These locomotives are all  gauge.

Standard gauge designs 1900 to 1922
These locomotives are all  gauge unless noted otherwise.

Standard gauge designs 1923 to 1947
These locomotives are all  gauge unless noted otherwise.

Standard gauge designs from 1948 onwards
These locomotives are all  gauge unless noted otherwise.

Narrow gauge steam locomotives

Broad gauge

Electric locomotives
These locomotives are  gauge.

Narrow gauge electric

Electric multiple units coaches
All these coaches are  gauge unless noted otherwise.

Electric tramcars

Internal combustion

Standard gauge locomotives
The following locomotives are all  gauge and powered by diesel engines unless noted otherwise.

Narrow gauge locomotives
These locomotives are all powered by diesel engines unless noted otherwise.

Diesel multiple unit coaches
All these coaches are  gauge and power by diesel engines unless noted otherwise.

Coaching stock

Non-passenger coaching stock

Goods wagons and freight stock

Rolling stock formerly part of the National Collection

Standard gauge steam locomotives

Internal combustion

Narrow gauge steam locomotives

Electric multiple unit coaches

Passenger coaches

Non-passenger coaching stock

Wagons

Notes

References

External links

Science Museum Group Collection

Preserved steam locomotives of Great Britain
National Collection
UK National Collection